Karolinka(until 1951 Karolinina Huť) is a town in Vsetín District in the Zlín Region of the Czech Republic. It has about 2,400 inhabitants.

Etymology
The name is a Czech diminutive form of woman name Caroline. It was derived from given name of stepmother of its founder, Jewish entrepreneur Salomon Reich. Until 1951, its name was Karolinina Huť, meaning "Karolina's Glassworks".

History
The settlement grew up around a glass factory established on territory of Nový Hrozenkov municipality in 1861. Karolinina Huť was separated as a municipality of its own from Nový Hrozenkov in 1949. In 1951, it was renamed Karolinka.

Twin towns – sister cities

Karolinka is twinned with:
 Bytča, Slovakia
 Papradno, Slovakia

 Vysoká nad Kysucou, Slovakia

References

External links

 

Cities and towns in the Czech Republic
Populated places in Vsetín District
Populated places established in 1861
1861 establishments in the Austrian Empire
Moravian Wallachia